Our Word Is Our Weapon is a collection of writings by Subcomandante Marcos of the Zapatista Army of National Liberation published by Seven Stories Press in 2002. Much of the book contains political essays, as well as stories and commentary in the style of magical realism, with conversations between Marcos and a beetle named Durito.

References

Further reading 

 
 

2002 non-fiction books
Zapatista Army of National Liberation
Magic realism
Books about indigenous rights
Seven Stories Press books